In Gallo-Roman religion, Sequana is the goddess of the river Seine, particularly the springs at the source of the Seine, and the Gaulish tribe the Sequani. The springs, called the Fontes Sequanae ("The Springs of Sequana"), are located in a valley in the Châtillon Plateau, to the north-west of Dijon in Burgundy, and it was here, in the 2nd or 1st century BC, that a healing shrine was established. The sanctuary was later taken over by the Romans, who built two temples, a colonnaded precinct and other related structures centred on the spring and pool. Many dedications were made to Sequana at her temple, including a large pot inscribed with her name and filled with bronze and silver models of parts of human bodies to be cured by her. Wooden and stone images of limbs, internal organs, heads, and complete bodies were offered to her in the hope of a cure, as well as numerous coins and items of jewellery. Respiratory illnesses and eye diseases were common. Pilgrims were frequently depicted as carrying offerings to the goddess, including money, fruit, or a favorite pet dog or bird.

Representations

A bronze statue of a woman, draped in a long gown and with a diadem on her head, represents Sequana (Deyts p. 74). She stands on a boat, the prow of which is shaped like the head of a duck with a ball in its mouth, representing the playful, sometimes rebellious, nature of her duck familiars. The bronze statue of the goddess Seine was found with that of a faun in 1933 by Henri Corot.

Cult, religion and oracles 
The cult of Sequana is closely linked to a primary element: water. Indeed, resting as a real focal point of attention of the cult, the sacredness of the aquatic element is at the center of the practices of homage or veneration rendered to Sequana. The expression of the divine presence is represented by this symbolic element chosen by the community practicing these tributes to the goddess.

This cult dedicated to a sacred site is above all public because it is practiced by private, modest people, but it is impossible to clearly link it to a precise practice.

Researchers have found three dedications to Sequana in the vicinity of Alesia and at the sources of the Seine: two are anatomical ex-votos and one is from a woman dedicating it pro salute nepotis, each of these dedications is linked to the emperor Augustus. A massive individual frequentation is translated by these anatomical ex-votos for the most part in wood and stone or bronze. In addition, several inscriptions were found (9 of which directly name Sequana), dedications to Sequana, which inform about religious practices and the public because they are often awkwardly spelled.

According to archaeologists, after having performed their ablutions and having passed to the temple of Sequana, the pilgrims offered to the divinity various offerings in the hope of a cure. In fact, during the Antiquity, religion and medicine were linked, the sanctuaries of the springs were comparable to medical centers for thermal cures. In addition to receiving offerings, we find, thanks to an inscription that mentions the name of the goddess, oracular practices either in favor of Sequana or perhaps Sequana herself rendered oracles regularly (like Clitunno). For all these practices dedicated to Sequana, there must be a cohabitation between the original sacred space and the monumental complex that was needed to honor the goddess.

Inscriptions
Eight inscriptions to Sequana are known, all from the Sources of the Seine. The following are typical (CIL 13, 02858):
Au(gusto) sac(rum) d(eae) Sequan(ae) e[x] / moni[tu]
and (CIL 13, 02862):
Aug(usto) sac(rum) / d(e)ae Seq(uanae) / Fl(avius) Flav(i)n(us) / pro sal(ute) / Fl(avi) Luna(ris) / nep(otis) sui / ex voto / v(otum) s(olvit) l(ibens) m(erito)/ San(tos) Mi(chaelle)

Some inscriptions contain spelling errors that may give a clue to the pronunciation of Sequana in Gaulish (CIL 13, 02863):
Aug(usto) sac(rum) d<e=O>a(e?) / <p=B>ro(!) / Se<q=C>uan(ae) / pro(!) / C(aius) M[...] / v(otum) s(olvit) l(ibens) m(erito)

As Gaulish is in the P-Celtic classification, q cannot represent the Indo-European kw. Something like Sek-ooana is more likely, unless the local dialect was Q-Celtic (which is not impossible).

References

 Bernard Jacomin (2006) Les sources de la Seine: traces fossiles et repérages astronomiques au pays des Lingons. Editions Yvelinédition 
 Corpus Inscriptionum Latinarum (CIL); vol. XIII, Inscriptiones trium Galliarum et Germaniarum. 6 vols. Berolini: apud G. Reimerum, 1899-1943
 Deyts, Simone (1992) Images des Dieux de la Gaule. Paris: Editions Errance .

Further reading

External links
 A small image of the bronze statue in the Musée archéologique de Dijon believed to represent Sequana

Gaulish goddesses
Sea and river goddesses
Sequani
Personifications of rivers
River Seine